I Squared Capital is a private equity firm focusing on global infrastructure investments. The company invests in energy, utilities, transport and telecom projects in North America, Europe and select high growth economies, such as India and China.

History 

Founded in 2012 and headquartered in Miami, the firm has offices in Hong Kong, Houston, London, New Delhi, New York and Singapore. Several of its executives were previously senior executives at Morgan Stanley, including Sadek Wahba, Adil Rahmathulla,and Gautam Bhandari.

In September 2018, I Squared Capital announced the closing of its ISQ Global Infrastructure Fund II at the US$7 billion legal cap, exceeding an initial target for the fund of US$5 billion.  The fund received commitments from over 100 institutional investors with oversubscribed demand and a re-up rate over 80 percent from Fund I.

Investments 
The firm has made investments in the U.S. hydroelectric power industry, in China's waste water treatment industry, and in India, including a majority stake in the 109-kilometer Jaipur Mahua Tollways in the northwestern state of Rajasthan, and a stake in the rooftop solar power company Amplus Energy Solutions Private Limited.

I Squared's hydro-electric power investments have been made through its portfolio company Cube Hydro Partners, which was formed in January 2014. Cube Hydro owns and operates 14 hydroelectric power facilities in the United States. and purchased four more plants in 2016. Kristina M. Johnson, a former undersecretary for energy at the U.S. Department of Energy, is the CEO of Cube Hydro.

On 31 December 2015, I Squared purchased the 220-mile pipeline gathering system owned by WPX Energy in the San Juan Basin in New Mexico. The purchase price was reported to be US$285 million.

In March 2016, the company struck a deal to buy the Irish power company Viridian for about one billion euros. Viridian provides about 20% of the power to Ireland.

In October 2016, I Squared Capital entered into an agreement with Duke Energy International's Latin American division to purchase all of the assets (excluding those in Brazil) for US$1.2 billion.  The investment will add hydroelectric and natural gas generation plants, transmission infrastructure, and natural gas processing facilities, totaling 2,300 megawatts of power.  The assets are located in Peru, Chile, Ecuador, Guatemala, El Salvador, and Argentina.<ref>{{Cite news|url=http://www.nasdaq.com/article/i-squared-to-buy-duke-energy-latin-american-units-excl-brazil-in-12-bln-deal-20161010-00760|title=I Squared To Buy Duke Energy Latin American Units Excl. Brazil In $1.2 Bln Deal|date=2016-10-10|newspaper=Nasdaq|access-date=2016-10-24}}</ref>  The transaction for the purchase of these assets from Duke Energy was completed in December 2016.

Orazul Energy Egenor S. en C. por A., a Lima, Peru-based subsidiary or Orazul Energy and a portfolio company of I Squared Capital announced on May 2, 2017 that the company had closed on a $550  million offering of 5.625% 10-year bonds due in 2027.

Li Ka-shing, Hong Kong's richest man, sold his Hutchison Telecommunications fixed-line phone business for $14.5 billion Hong Kong Dollars ($1.86bn USD).  Hutchison Global Communications runs an extensive fiber-optic network that connects to over 14,000 buildings.  It is also a major provider of WiFi services to Hong Kong.  HGC's fiber optic network consists of over 1.4 million kilometers of cable and its WiFi network includes over 25,000 hot-spots.  The company's extensive international network has four highly prized land routes into mainland China and it has global reach through multiple sub-marine and terrestrial cable systems.

In August 2018, I Squared entered into an agreement to sell 100 percent of its equity interest in Lincoln Clean Energy LLC to Ørsted for an enterprise valuation of $580 million.  Lincoln Clean Energy is a leasing U.S.-based developer, owner, and operator or wind farms.

In November 2018, I Squared Capital, along with Blackstone Energy and EagleClaw formed a Delaware Basin midstream partnership.  The firm invested over US$500 million in cash and contributed its Delaware Basin midstream portfolio company, Pinnacle Midstream.

In February 2020, the company entered into an agreement to sell its stake in Chenya Energy, a solar development company in Taiwan, to Marubeni Corporation, a Japanese firm.

In October 2020, they agreed to buy the infrastructure division of GTT Communications for $2.15 billion 

 Notable Advisors 
Boutros Boutros-Ghali, former Secretary-General of the United Nations and Egypt's Minister of Foreign Affairs, served as an advisor to the fund. In 2013, Jonson Cox, the chairman of the UK's Water Services Regulation Authority, was appointed as a senior policy advisor of I Squared. Tom J. Donohue, President & CEO of the United States Chamber of Commerce and Ginger Lew, former Senior Counsel to White House on Economic Policy, are advisors to I Squared.

 Awards 
In 2016, I Squared won six awards from Infrastructure Investor, including "Global Personality of the Year", "Global Fund Manager of the Year,"  "Global Fundraising of the Year," "North America Fundraising of the Year," "North America Fund Manager of the Year," and "Asia Pacific Transport Investor of the Year."

In 2018, I Squared won six awards from Infrastructure Investor'', including "Global Personality of the Year" for Sadek Wahba, "Global Fund Manager of the Year," Global Equity Fundraising of the Year," "Global Transport Investor of the Year," "North America Fund Manager of the Year," and "North America Energy Investor of the Year." It was also named "Energy Private Equity Firm of the Year" at the 2018 Private Equity International Awards, edging out Actis and Ares Management.

References 

American companies established in 2012
Financial services companies established in 2012
Financial services companies of the United States
2012 establishments in Florida